Willy Hugo Hellpach (26 February 1877 in Oels, Silesia – 6 July 1955 in Heidelberg) was the sixth State President of Baden. He was a member of the German Democratic Party (DDP). He was also a physician and psychologist.

Early life and education 
Hellpach went to school in Greifswald to study medicine. Following his graduation in 1897, he went to Leipzig to study psychology. He received his doctorate and opened a practice in 1904. He served as a doctor in the First World War.

Career 
In 1918, he joined the DDP in Baden. In 1922, he became Minister for Teaching, and in 1924, with the surge of support to the DDP, became State President of Baden. In elections the following year, the Centre Party under Gustav Trunk regained their majority. Hellpach then ran for Reich President following the death of Friedrich Ebert, but only received 5.8% of the vote. Following a brief (1928–1930) seat in the Reichstag, Hellpach withdrew from politics.

He wrote a book Geopsyche in 1935 that is credited with being the first mention of the field of environmental psychology.

External links 
Biography
Rulers of Baden
Guide to the Hellpach-Kubatzki Correspondence Collection at the Leo Baeck Institute, New York, NY. 
 

1877 births
1955 deaths
People from Oleśnica
People from the Province of Silesia
German Protestants
German Democratic Party politicians
Members of the Reichstag of the Weimar Republic
Candidates for President of Germany
Knights Commander of the Order of Merit of the Federal Republic of Germany